The Indiana College Athletic League was a short-lived intercollegiate athletic conference that existed from 1916 to 1923, although some form of the league may have existed as far back as 1902. The league had members in the state of Indiana.

Membership
This is a possibly incomplete list of members, compiled by histories of conference affiliations by college teams residing in Indiana.  The years of conference membership may also be inaccurate. Five of these members, DePauw, Earlham, Franklin, Hanover, and Indiana State went on to form the Indiana Intercollegiate Conference (IIC) in 1922, after an apparent dissolution of the former league.  

 Butler (1916–1917)
 DePauw (1916)
 Earlham (1902–1922)
 Franklin (needs confirmation of membership)
 Hanover (1916–1917)
 Indiana State (1919?–1923)
 Rose Polytechnic (1916–)
 Wabash (1916–1917, 1919?)

Baseball champions

 1916:
 1917:
 1918:
 1919: Indiana State
 1920: Indiana State
 1921: Indiana State
 1922:
 1923: Indiana State

Football champions

 1916: Wabash
 1917: Rose Polytechnic
 1918: No champion, World War I
 1919: Wabash

See also
 List of defunct college football conferences

References

Defunct college sports conferences in the United States
College sports in Indiana